Tosen Ra (in Japanese: トーセンラー) (foaled April 21, 2008 ) is a Japanese Thoroughbred racehorse who won the 2013 Mile Championship.

Career

Tosen's first race was on November 7, 2010 in Kyoto in which she came in 1st place. He then won the Kisaragi Sho on February 6, 2011. 

On February 10, 2013, he won the 2013 Kyōto Kinen. 

On November 17, 2013, he won the biggest race of his career, winning the Group 1 2013 Mile Championship, which proved to be the last win of his career. 

On December 28, 2014, he came in 8th on his last race in the 2014 Arima Kinen.

Pedigree

References

2008 racehorse births
Racehorses bred in Japan
Racehorses trained in Japan
Thoroughbred family 17-b